The Odd Fellows Hall in Old Town Eureka, California, also known as the French Empire Mansard Building, is a Second Empire architecture style building built in 1883.  
  
The building served historically as a department store, as a professional building, as a clubhouse, and as a meeting hall for Odd Fellows. It was listed on the National Register of Historic Places in 1978.

See also
 Odd Fellows Building (Red Bluff, California): Another lodge in northern California
 National Register of Historic Places listings in Humboldt County, California

References

Clubhouses on the National Register of Historic Places in California
Second Empire architecture in California
Cultural infrastructure completed in 1883
Buildings and structures in Eureka, California
Odd Fellows buildings in California
National Register of Historic Places in Humboldt County, California